The 2000 Woking Council election took place on 4 May 2000 to elect members of Woking Borough Council in Surrey, England. The whole council was up for election with boundary changes since the last election in 1999 increasing the number of seats by one. The council stayed under no overall control, and overall turnout in the election was 34.32%.

Election result

Ward results

References

2000
2000 English local elections
2000s in Surrey